Old City Hall, which existed from 1869 to 1933, was the first such structure in the crown colony of Hong Kong. Its function differed from a town hall in that it was used solely for community purposes and did not house any government offices. It occupied the current sites of the HSBC Hong Kong headquarters building (partly) and the Bank of China Building. 
It was designed by the French architect Achille-Antoine Hermitte and was opened by Prince Alfred, Duke of Edinburgh, in a ceremony on 28 June 1869.
The current site of the HSBC Hong Kong headquarters building was occupied in part by the old City Hall, and in part by the first and second generations of the HSBC building.

Design and function

The City Hall was built on Government land, and funds were raised for its construction, which started in 1866, from public subscriptions. The two-storey hall was designed by Me French architect Achille-Antoine Hermitte in a Renaissance style, with cupolae, colonnades and arches. The facilities available for use by the local community included a theatre, library, museum and assembly rooms. A fountain - Dent's Fountain, sponsored by Dent & Co., was located at the front (south side) of the Hall. The building was inaugurated by HRH Prince Alfred, Duke of Edinburgh on 2 November 1869 on his visit to the colony.

The land was acquired by the Hong Kong Bank in 1933 for its third generation headquarters, so that the western part of City Hall was pulled down. The remaining part was demolished in 1947 to make way for the Bank of China Building.

Theatre
The Hall housed the Theatre Royal, a 569 seats performance space which hosted a number of amateur and professional theatre performances for residents of the colony. The theatre was renovated in 1903 to improve the function and acoustics.

See also
 Hong Kong City Hall
 The Hongkong and Shanghai Banking Corporation

References

Demolished buildings and structures in Hong Kong
Buildings and structures demolished in 1947
Former seats of local government